Malibeyli or Ajapnyak is a village de facto part of Stepanakert city in the breakaway Republic of Artsakh, de jure in the Shusha District of Azerbaijan.

References

External links 
 
 

Stepanakert
Populated places in Shusha District